Tobias Müller (born 8 July 1994) is a German professional footballer who plays as a defender for  club SC Paderborn.

Club career
On 23 May 2022, Müller signed with SC Paderborn for the 2022–23 season.

References

External links
 Profile at kicker.de

1994 births
Living people
German footballers
Association football defenders
FC Nöttingen players
SC Freiburg II players
Hallescher FC players
1. FC Magdeburg players
SC Paderborn 07 players
Regionalliga players
3. Liga players
2. Bundesliga players